Groshev (masculine) or Grosheva (feminine) is a Russian surname. Notable people with the surname include:

Elena Grosheva (born 1979), Russian gymnast
Maksim Groshev (born 1978), Russian footballer
Yevgeni Groshev (1937–2013), Russian Soviet ice hockey player
Momcilo Groshev (1960–2010), Macedonian goalkeeper

See also
Groshev GN-7, Soviet sailplane
 

Russian-language surnames
Bulgarian-language surnames
Macedonian-language surnames

ru:Грошев